Thadanius is an extinct genus of Litoptern, belonging to the family Adianthidae. It lived during the Late Oligocene, in what is today Bolivia.

Description

Only known from the fossilized remains of its mandible and teeth, this animal may have been similar to its relatives Adianthus and Adiantoides, and probably was a small animal, the size of a small dog and slender in build. Thadanius was characterized by moderately high crowned teeth ; the lower molars were devoid of anterior cingulum, while the hypoconulid was not expanded as in other contemporary Adianthidae, such as Tricoelodus and Proadiantus to form a third lobe on the third molar. The entoconid did not reach the apex of the hypoconulid, but was connected to an hypoconulid-entoconid crest, and a rudimentary entolophid was present, especially on the third lower molar. There was no basin on the lower third molar.

Classification

Thadanius was a member of the Adianthidae, a clade of small-sized litopterns that went extinct during the Miocene period. Thadanius shares similarities with Proadiantus, and they may have been related, as Tricoelodus.

Thadanius was first described in 1983, based on fragmentary remains from the Salla Formation, in the Loayza Province of Bolivia, in terrains dated from the Late Oligocene. Its name is an anagram of Adianthus, the eponymous genus of Adianthidae.

References

Litopterns
Oligocene mammals of South America
Paleogene Bolivia
Fossils of Bolivia
Fossil taxa described in 1983
Prehistoric placental genera